Prague Towers (A and B) are two highrise residential buildings in Prague district Stodůlky, Czech Republic. They're located near Prokop valley and Dalejské údolí (valley). The nearest metro station is Lužiny, 600m far. This building were built by Czech developer Central Group. Both buildings have around 300 flats, height 65m, 21 floors. Towers were built in 2011.

References 

2011 establishments in the Czech Republic
Residential skyscrapers
Skyscrapers in Prague
Residential buildings in the Czech Republic
Residential buildings completed in 2011
21st-century architecture in the Czech Republic